Paragomphus magnus, the great hooktail is a species of dragonfly in the family Gomphidae.

Distribution and status
This species is found in Kenya, Mozambique, Tanzania, Zimbabwe and South Africa. Although uncommon, it has a large range, and is not considered threatened.

Habitat
Natural habitats include subtropical and tropical rivers and streams in wooded country at low elevations.

References

External links

Gomphidae
Taxonomy articles created by Polbot
Insects described in 1952